Amar Asyraf Zailuddin (born 15 November 1986) is a Malaysian actor. He had his debut in 2011, and has acted in dramas, films and television shows.

Career

Amar's first film was Penunggu Istana in 2011, but his popularity grew after acting in Setia Hujung Nyawa as Zain Hakimi in 2012. After the end of this show, which gained him further fame, he continued acting in dramas, television dramas and also films. On 8 November 2015, he won the Best Actor Award for Drama Category in Anugerah Skrin 2015, a yearly award competition for filmmakers and drama makers in Malaysia.

Early life

Amar was born on 15 November 1986, and origin from Masjid Tanah, Melaka Malaysia. Amar also graduate diploma in Art Directing and Acting from Akademi Seni Kebangsaan (the National Arts Academy) (Aswara).

Personal life

Amar got engaged in 2011 to Arna Salleh after a relationship of 2 years. On 7 June 2013, Amar Asyraf married Arna Salleh.

Filmography

Television series

Telemovie

Film

References

External links
 

1986 births
People from Malacca
Malaysian male television actors
Living people
Malaysian people of Malay descent
21st-century Malaysian male actors
Malaysian television personalities